List of former equipment of the Hellenic armed forces from 1821 until after 1945.

Offensive weapons

Greek war of independence (1821–1829) and after (1830-1911)

Edged weapons

Bayonet (Made in different countries, to attach on rifles and muskets)
Improvised knife (Greek made)
Janbiya dagger (Arabian made)
Khanjali dagger sword (Caucasian made, also known as Kinzhal)
M1730 sword (Austrian made)
Yatagan sabre (Turkish captured and Greek made)

Pistols and revolvers

Agrafa flintlock pistol (Greek made)
Chamelot-Delvigne M1873, M1874 and M1884 revolver (French made)
Ktoros M1837 caplock pistol (Greek made)
Lefaucheux M1854 revolver (French made)
Nagant M1895 revolver (Belgian made)

Rifles and muskets

Berthier M1892 carbine (French made)
Boyliya flintlock musket (Turkish captured)
Brown Bess flintlock musket (British made)
Carlo & figlio Lazarin M1790 flintlock musket (Italian origin and Greek made)
Carlo & figlio M1800 and M1820 flintlock musket (Italian origin and Greek made)
Charleville flintlock musket (French made)
Chassepot Μ1866 rifle (French made)
Comblain M1870 rifle (Belgian made)
Filippidis M1905 rifle (Austrian origin and Greek modification)
Gras M1874 rifle (French made)
Ktoros M1837 caplock musket (Greek made)
Lebel M1886 rifle (French made)
Mannlicher M1895 rifle (Austrian made)
Mylonas M1872 rifle (Belgian made and Greek origin)
Nafplion M1833 caplock musket (French and Greek made)
Rasak flintlock musket (Balkan origin and Greek made)
Sishane M1812 flintlock musket (Turkish captured)
Tufek flintlock musket (Turkish captured)
Vasilopulos M1901 rifle (Greek made)

Grenades

Improvised bombs and grenades (Greek made)

Special weapons

Vasiliadis sea mine (Greek made)

Artillery

Trieste mountain cannon (Italian made)

Other vehicles

Horses (Origin from different countries and Greek bred)
Horse drawn carriages (Made in various countries, including Greece)
Steam powered carriages (Made in different countries, to carry supplies)

Ships

Afroessa Steamship (Scottish made)
Aktion Ι steam gunboat (British made, also known as Spetses ΙΙ)
Alexandros Brig (Russian captured)
Amfitriti ΙΙΙ steam gunboat (British made)
Amfitriti IV steamship (British made, also known as Malvina and Bubulina)
Aris Barco (Italian made, also known as Iraklis)
Aris Brig (Italian made, also known as Athina)
Arkadion Steamship (British made)
Emmanuil Ship of the line (Russian made)
Enosis Steamship (British made)
Epihirisis Paddle steamship (British made)
Ermis Ι paddle steamship (British made)
Hellas Ι frigate (American made, one of two ordered from American shipyard, also known as Elpis)
Hydra Ι corvette (Greek made)
Hydra ΙΙ steam gunboat (British made, renamed Amvrakia ΙΙ)
Hydra-class ironclad battleships (French made)
Hydra
Psara
Spetses
Kalavria Paddle steamship (British made)
Karteria Paddle steamship (British made, it was the first steam powered warship to be used in combat)
Kissa-class steamships (British made)
Aidon Ι
Kihli Ι
Kissa Ι
Kriti Ι steamship (British made)
Miaulis II cruiser (French made)
Orfefs Brig (Russian made)
Panellinion Steamship (British made)
Panopi I steamship (Scottish made)
Panopi ΙI steamship (Scottish made)
Paralos Steamship (Scottish made)
Patra Ι corvette (Russian made, also known as Ariadni)
Persefs Brig (Russian made)
Pliksavra Steamship (Scottish made)
Poros Amalia Ι corvette (Greek made)
Poros Athina Ι paddle steamship (Greek made, also known as Othon)
Poros Messologion corvette (Greek made, also known as Ludovikos)
Psara Ι corvette (Greek made, renamed Prigips Maximilianos)
Psara ΙΙ steamship (Scottish made, renamed Kanaris ΙΙ)
Psara Galiot (Greek made)
Salaminia Ι steamship (Scottish made)
Sfendoni Steamship (Scottish made, also known as Nafplion)
Spetses Ι Agamemnon corvette (Greek made)
Vasilefs Georgios Ironclad corvette (British made)
Vasilissa Olga Ironclad corvette (Austrian made)

Submarines

Gryparis Submarine (Greek made, possibly available to the Hellenic navy)
Nordenfelt I Pireas (British origin, Swedish made and Greek assembly)
Vuteas Submarine (Greek made, possibly available to the Hellenic navy)

Balkan wars (1912-1913) and World war I (1917-1918)

Edged weapons

Bayonet (Made in different countries, to attach on rifles)
Improvised knife (Greek made)

Pistols and revolvers

Bergmann-Bayard M1903 and M1908 (German made)
Browning FN M1900 (American origin and Belgian made)
Browning FN M1903 (American origin and Belgian made)
Chamelot-Delvigne M1873, M1874 and M1884 (French made)
Colt M1907 Army Special (American made)
Mannlicher M1901 (Austrian made)
Nagant M1895 (Belgian made)
Ruby M1914 (French made)

Rifles

Berthier M1892, M1892/16, M1907/15 and M1916 (French made)
Gras M1874 and M1874/14 (French made)
Lebel M1886/93 (French made)
Mannlicher M1895 (Austrian made)
Mannlicher-Schönauer M1903 and M1903/14 (Austrian made)

Light machine guns

Chauchat M1915 (French made)

Medium machine guns

Colt-Browning M1895/14 (American made)
Hotchkiss M1914 (American origin and French made)
Saint Étienne M1907/16 (French made)

Heavy machine guns

Schwarzlose M1907/12 (Austrian made)

Grenades

F1 M1915, M1916 and M1917 (French made)
Improvised bombs and grenades (Greek made)

Mortars

Aasen 88.9mm M1915 (French made)
Stokes mortar (British made)

Artillery

75mm M1897 field cannon (French made)
De Bange 120mm L M1878 siege cannon (French made)
Gruson 5.3cm L/24 M1890 fahrpanzer (Bulgarian captured and German origin cannon turret)
Krupp 7.5cm L/14 M1904 feldkanone (Turkish captured and German origin field cannon)
Krupp 7.5cm L/30 M1904 gebirgskanone (Turkish captured and German origin mountain cannon)
Krupp 10.5cm L/35 M1880 festungkanone (German made fortress cannon)
Krupp 15cm L/25 M1880 festungkanone (German made fortress cannon)
Krupp-Lykudis 7.5cm gebirgskanone (German made and Greek origin mountain cannon)
Ordnance BL 6-inch 30 cwt howitzer (British made)
Schneider 155mm C M1917 field howitzer (French made)
Schneider-Canet 75mm M1910 mountain cannon (French made)
Schneider-Creusot 75mm M1906 field cannon (French made)
Schneider-Danglis 75mm M1906/09 mountain cannon (French made and Greek origin)
Schneider-Ducrest 65mm M1906 mountain cannon (French made)
Skoda 105mm M1916 mountain cannon (Czechoslovak made)

Other vehicles

Horses (Origin from different countries and Greek bred)
Horse drawn carriages (Made in various countries, including Greece)
Knox-Martin Gun carrier (American made)
Motorcycles (Made in different countries)
Trucks (Made in different countries, to carry supplies)

Ships

Aktion Ι steam gunboat (British made, also known as Spetses ΙΙ)
Amfitriti IV steamship (British made, also known as Malvina and Bubulina)
Amfitriti V steamship (French made)
Antalya Torpedo boat (Turkish captured, renamed Nikopolis)
Averof Cruiser (Italian made)
Belomorets Tugboat (Bulgarian captured)
Egli-class torpedo boats (German made)
Alkioni Ι
Arethusa
Dafni ΙΙ
Doris Ι
Egli Ι
Thetis ΙΙ
Elli Cruiser (American made, the name derived from the ancient Greek Ellispondos of Dardanelles)
Hydra ΙΙ steam gunboat (British made, renamed Amvrakia ΙΙ)
Hydra-class ironclad battleships (French made)
Hydra
Psara
Spetses
Kilkis Battleship (American made)
Kissa-class steamships (British made)
Aidon Ι
Kihli Ι
Kissa Ι
Limnos Battleship (American made)
Niki-class destroyers (German made)
Aspis Ι
Doxa Ι
Niki Ι
Velos Ι
Psara ΙΙ steamship (Scottish made, renamed Kanaris ΙΙ)
Thiria-class destroyers (British made)
D-01 Aetos Ι
D-36 Ierax ΙΙ
D-50 Leon II
D-72 Panthir I
Thyella-class destroyers (British made)
Lonhi
Nafkratusa
Sfendoni
Thyella
Tokat Torpedo boat (Turkish captured, renamed Tatoi)
V-class destroyers (German made)
Keravnos
Nea Genea

Submarines

Schneider Delfin Ι (French made)
Schneider Xifias Ι (French made)

Aircraft

Airco D.H.4 (British made)
Airco D.H.6 (British made)
Airco D.H.9 (British made)
Astra Hydroplane (Spanish origin and French made, it had the nickname Naftilos)
Avro 504K (British origin and Greek made)
Blériot XI-2 (Turkish captured and French origin)
Breguet 14A2 and B2 (French made)
Bristol 2 Scout C (British made)
Caudron G.3 (French made)
Dorand AR.1 and AR.2 (French made)
Fairey Hamble Hydroplane (British made)
Farman HF.III (French made, Greek assembly and modification, it had the nicknames Gypas, Ierax, Aetos and Daedalos)
Farman HF.XX (French made)
Farman HF.XXII (French made)
Farman HF.XXVII (French made)
Farman MF.VII (French made)
Farman MF.VII bis hydravion (French made)
Nieuport 4G (French made, it had the nickname Alkion)
Nieuport 24 and 24bis (French made)
Nieuport 27 (French made)
Pelterie R.E.P. Ν (Turkish captured and French origin)
Royal Aircraft Factory B.E.2C and E (British made)
Short 184 hydroplane (British made)
Sopwith 1.5 Strutter (British made)
Sopwith Bat flying boat (British made)
Sopwith Camel (British made)
Sopwith Pup (British made)
Sopwith Pusher hydroplane (British made)
SPAD S.VII (French made)
SPAD S.XIII (French made)

Russian civil war (1919) and Greco-Turkish war (1919–1922)

Edged weapons

Bayonet (Made in different countries, to attach on rifles)
Improvised knife (Greek made)

Pistols and revolvers

Bergmann-Bayard M1903 and M1908 (German made)
Nagant M1895 (Belgian made)
Ruby M1914 (French made)

Rifles

Berthier M1892, M1892/16, M1907/15 and M1916 (French made)
Gras M1874 and M1874/14 (French made)
Lebel M1886/93 (French made)
Mannlicher M1895 (Austrian made)
Mannlicher-Schönauer M1903 and M1903/14 (Austrian made)

Light machine guns

Chauchat M1915 (French made)

Medium machine guns

Hotchkiss M1914 (American origin and French made)
Saint Étienne M1907/16 (French made)

Heavy machine guns

Schwarzlose M1907/12 (Austrian made)

Grenades

F1 M1915, M1916 and M1917 (French made)
Improvised bombs and grenades (Greek made)

Artillery

75mm M1897 field cannon (French made)
De Bange 120mm L M1878 siege cannon (French made)
Ordnance BL 6-inch 30 cwt howitzer (British made)
Schneider 155mm C M1917 field howitzer (French made)
Schneider-Canet 75mm M1910 mountain cannon (French made)
Schneider-Creusot 75mm M1906 field cannon (French made)
Schneider-Danglis 75mm M1906/09 mountain cannon (French made and Greek origin)
Schneider-Ducrest 65mm M1906 mountain cannon (French made)
Skoda 105mm M1916 mountain cannon (Czechoslovak made)

Other vehicles

Horses (Origin from different countries and Greek bred)
Horse drawn carriages (Made in various countries, including Greece)
Latil TAR (French made gun carrier)
Motorcycles (Made in different countries)
Trucks (Made in various countries, to carry supplies)

Ships

Aktion ΙΙ minelayer (German made)
Averof Cruiser (Italian made)
Egli-class torpedo boats (German made)
Alkioni Ι
Arethusa
Dafni ΙΙ
Doris Ι
Egli Ι
Thetis ΙΙ
Elli Cruiser (American made, the name derived from the ancient Greek Ellispondos of Dardanelles)
Keravnos Destroyer (German made)
Kilkis Battleship (American made)
Kydonia-class torpedo boats (Austrian made)
Kios
Kydonia
Kyzikos
Panormos
Pergamos
Prusa
Limnos Battleship (American made)
Niki-class destroyers (German made)
Aspis Ι
Niki Ι
Velos Ι
Thiria-class destroyers (British made)
D-01 Aetos Ι
D-36 Ierax ΙΙ
D-50 Leon II
D-72 Panthir I
Thyella-class destroyers (British made)
Lonhi
Nafkratusa
Sfendoni
Thyella
Vasilissa Sofia Ι steamship (German made)

Aircraft

Airco D.H.4 (British made)
Airco D.H.9 (British made)
Ansaldo A.1 (Italian captured)
Avro 504K (British origin and Greek made)
Breguet 14A2 and B2 (French made)
Caudron G.3 (French made)
Dorand AR.1 and AR.2 (French made)
Fairey Hamble Hydroplane (British made)
Nieuport 24 and 24bis (French made)
Nieuport 27 (French made)
Royal Aircraft Factory B.E.2C and E (British made)
Sopwith 1.5 Strutter (British made)
Sopwith Camel (British made)
SPAD S.VII (French made)
SPAD S.XIII (French made)

Interwar (1923-1939) and World war II (1940-1945)

Edged weapons

Bayonet (Made in different countries, to attach on rifles)
Improvised knife (Greek made)

Pistols and revolvers

Beretta M1934 (Italian captured)
Beretta M1935 (Italian captured)
Bergmann-Bayard M1908 (German made)
Browning FN M1910/22 (American origin and Belgian made)
Colt M1927 Official Police (American made)
Luger pistol (German captured)
Nagant M1895 (Belgian made)
Ruby M1914 (French made)

Submachine guns

Beretta M1938 (Italian captured)
M3 submachine gun (American made, also known as grease gun, used by mountain commandos and exiled Greek forces)
MP 34 (German captured, used by gendarmerie and police forces)
MP 40 (German captured)
Sten submachine gun (British made, used by exiled Greek forces)
Thompson M1928 and M1A1 (American made, used by exiled Greek forces)

Rifles

Berthier M1892, M1892/16, M1907/15 and M1916 (French made)
Carcano rifle (Italian captured)
Gras M1874 and M1874/14 (French made)
Lebel M1886/93 (French made)
Lee-Enfield rifle (British made, used by exiled Greek forces)
Mannlicher M1895 (Austrian made)
Mannlicher-Schönauer M1903, M1903/14, M1903/27 and M1903/30 (Austrian made)
Mauser FN M1930 (Belgian made and German origin)
Rigopulos M1941 (Austrian origin and Greek modification)

Light machine guns

Breda M1930 (Italian captured)
Bren machine gun (British made, used by exiled Greek forces)
Chauchat M1915 (French made)
EPK M1939 (Greek made)
Hotchkiss Μ1922/26 (American origin and French made)

Medium machine guns

Hotchkiss M1914 (American origin and French made)
Hotchkiss modified machine gun (American origin, French made and Greek modification)
Saint Étienne M1907/16 (French made)

Heavy machine guns

Schwarzlose M1907/12 (Austrian made)

Grenades

F1 grenade (French made)
Improvised bombs and grenades (Greek made)

Mortars

Brandt M1927/31 (French made)
Brixia M1935 (Italian captured)

Special weapons

Skuras & Romanos depth charge (Greek made)
Stylianos & Konstadaras depth charge (Greek made)
Stylianos & Konstadaras sea mine (Greek made)
STYLKON Argonaftis sea mine (Greek made)
STYLKON depth charge (Greek made)
STYLKON M sea mine (Greek made)

Anti-tank weapons

PIAT (British made)

Anti-aircraft weapons

Bofors 80mm M1929 AA gun (Swedish made)
Hotchkiss 25mm M1939 AA gun (American origin and French made)
Rheinmetall 2cm M1937 flugzeugabwehrkanone (German captured AA gun)
Rheinmetall 3.7cm M1937 flugzeugabwehrkanone (German captured AA gun)

Artillery

75mm M1897 field cannon (French made)
75mm M1917 field cannon (American made and British origin)
De Bange 120mm L M1878 siege cannon (French made)
Ordnance BL 6-inch 30 cwt howitzer (British made)
Schneider 75mm M1919 mountain cannon (French made)
Schneider 85mm M1927 field cannon (French made)
Schneider 105mm M1919/24 mountain cannon (French made)
Schneider 105mm M1925/27 field cannon (French made)
Schneider 155mm C M1917 field howitzer (French made)
Schneider-Canet 75mm M1910 mountain cannon (French made)
Schneider-Creusot 75mm M1906 field cannon (French made)
Schneider-Danglis 75mm M1906/09 mountain cannon (French made and Greek origin)
Schneider-Ducrest 65mm M1906 mountain cannon (French made)
Skoda 100mm M1914/19 field howitzer (Czechoslovak made)
Skoda 105mm M1916 mountain cannon (Czechoslovak made)

Other vehicles

AEC Matador (British made gun carrier)
Demag Sonderkraftfahrzeug Sd.Kfz.10/1 (German captured halftrack gun carrier)
Hanomag WD-50 (German made gun carrier)
Horses (Origin from different countries and Greek bred)
Horse drawn carriages (Made in various countries, including Greece)
M3A1 Scout Car (American made armoured personnel carrier)
Morris C8 (British made gun carrier)
Motorcycles (Made in different countries)
Pavesi P4/100 (Italian made gun carrier)
SOMUA MCG5 (French origin and Greek modification halftrack gun carrier)
Trucks (Made in different countries, to carry supplies)
Universal Carrier (British made supply carrier)
Vickers Light Dragon Mk IIC (British made gun carrier)
Willys MB (American made personnel carrier, also known as Jeep)

Self-propelled artillery

Ford F30 2-pounder self-propelled AT gun (American made anti-tank truck)

Armoured cars and trucks

ACV-IP Mk II (British and Indian made armoured carrier)
Daimler Dingo Mk II (British made light armoured car)
Fiat-Ansaldo AB41 (Italian captured armoured car)
Ford Lynx Mk II (Canadian made light armoured car)
General Motors C15TA (Canadian made armoured truck)
General Motors Otter (Canadian made light armoured truck)
Humber LRC (British made light armoured car)
Marmon-Herrington Mk I, Mk III and Mk IV F (South African made armoured car)
Peerless Vickers Armoured truck (American, British origin and Greek modification)

Tanks

Fiat-Ansaldo L3/35 (Italian captured tankette)
Fiat M13/40 (Italian captured medium tank)
Vickers 6ton Mk EA and Mk EB (British made light tank)
Vickers-Carden-Loyd M1936 (British made light tank)
Vickers-Carden-Loyd Mk VI (British made tankette)

Ships

Amfitriti IV steamship (British made, also known as Malvina and Bubulina)
Aris Training steamship (French made)
Averof Cruiser (Italian made)
D14 Vasilefs Georgios destroyer (British made)
D15 Vasilissa Olga destroyer (British made)
Egli-class torpedo boats (German made)
Alkioni Ι
Arethusa
Doris Ι
Egli Ι
Elli Cruiser (American made, the name derived from the ancient Greek Ellispondos of Dardanelles)
Flower-class corvettes (British made)
Apostolis ΙΙ
Kriezis ΙΙ
Sahturis ΙΙ
Tombazis ΙΙ
Freccia-class destroyers (Italian made)
D96 Psara
D97 Hydra
D98 Spetses
D99 Kunturiotis
Harbour defence motor launch boat ML1051 (British made)
Harbour defence motor launch boat ML1149 (British made)
Harbour defence motor launch boat ML1221 (British made)
Hunt-class destroyers (British made)
L51 Themistoklis
L53 Kanaris
L65 Pindos
L67 Adrias (The name derived from the ancient Greek Adriatic)
L84 Kriti
L91 Miaulis
Kihli Ι steamship (British made)
Kilkis Battleship (American made)
Kydonia-class torpedo boats (Austrian made)
Kios
Kydonia
Kyzikos
Pergamos
Prusa
L158 Limnos tank landing ship (American made)
L179 Samos tank landing ship (American made)
L195 Hios tank landing ship (American made)
Lavrion A5 patrol boat (Italian and Greek made)
Limnos Battleship (American made)
M209 Afroessa minesweeper (British made)
M210 Leros minesweeper (British made)
M212 Kos minesweeper (British made)
Niki-class destroyers (German made)
Aspis Ι
Niki Ι
Paralos Minesweeper (American made)
Salamis K1 tugboat (Greek made)
T1 and T2 Torpedo boat (British made)
Thiria-class destroyers (British made)
D-01 Aetos Ι
D-36 Ierax ΙΙ
D-50 Leon II
D-72 Panthir I
Thyella-class destroyers (British made)
Sfendoni
Thyella

Submarines

Katsonis-class submarines (French made)
Y1 Katsonis ΙΙ
Y2 Papanikolis Ι
Protefs-class submarines (French made)
Y3 Protefs Ι
Υ4 Nirefs Ι
Υ5 Triton Ι
Y6 Glafkos ΙΙ
Υ7 Matrozos (Italian captured)
Υ8 Pipinos (British made)

Aircraft

Arado Ar 196A-3 and A-5 (German captured)
Armstrong Whitworth Atlas Mk I (British origin and Greek made)
Avia B-534-II (Czechoslovak made)
Avia BH-33SHS (Czechoslovak made)
Avro 504K, N and O (British origin and Greek made)
Avro 621 Tutor (British origin and Greek made)
Avro 626 Prefect (British made)
Avro 652 Anson Mk I and Mk II (British made)
Blackburn T.3 and T.3A Velos (British origin and Greek made)
Bloch MB.151C1 (French made)
Breguet 19A2 and B2 (French made)
Bristol 81A and 86 Tourer (British made)
Bristol Blenheim Mk I, Mk IV and Mk V (British made)
De Havilland D.H.60 Gipsy Moth (British made)
Dornier Do 22KG (German made)
Fairey IΙIΒ, IIIF Mk I and IIIM (British made)
Fairey Battle Mk I (British made)
Fieseler Fi 156C-1 (German captured)
Gloster Gladiator Mk I and Mk II (British made)
Gloster Mars Mk VI (British made, also known as Nieuport Nighthawk)
Hanriot HD.14 (French made)
Hanriot HD.17 (French made)
Hanriot H.41 (French made)
Hawker Horsley Mk II (British made)
Hawker Hurricane Mk I, Mk IIB and Mk IIC (British made)
Henschel Hs 126K-6 (German made)
Junkers G 24 (German made)
Junkers Ju 52-3M (German captured)
Junkers Ju 290A-5 (German captured)
KEA Chelidon (Greek made)
Martin 187 A-30A Baltimore Mk III, Mk IIIA, Mk IV and Mk V (American made)
Messerschmitt Bf 109G-6 (German captured)
Morane-Saulnier MS.35 (French made, also known as Morane-Saulnier AR)
Morane-Saulnier MS.137 (French made)
Morane-Saulnier MS.147 (French made)
Morane-Saulnier MS.230 (French made)
Potez 25A2 (French made)
Potez 633B2 (French made)
Raab-AEKKEA R-1C Schwalbe II (German origin and Greek made, possibly available to the Hellenic air force)
Raab-AEKKEA R-26V, R-33 Tigerschwalbe (Greek made, possibly available to the Hellenic air force)
Raab-AEKKEA R-27 (German origin and Greek made, possibly available to the Hellenic air force)
Raab-AEKKEA R-29 (Greek made, possibly available to the Hellenic air force)
Stearman-Boeing-Kaydet 75 PT-13 and PT-17 (American made)
PZL P-24F and G (Polish made)
Savoia-Marchetti SM.79-I (Italian captured)
Supermarine Spitfire Mk VB, Mk VC, Mk IX and Mk XVI (British made)
Taylorcraft Auster Mk III (British made)

Post-World war II (1946 and after)
Note that this equipment is mainly retired.

Edged weapons

Bayonet (Made in different countries, to attach on rifles)
Improvised knife (Greek made)

Pistols and revolvers

EVO M1985 semiautomatic pistol (German origin and Greek made)

Submachine guns

HROPI GP10 submachine gun (Greek made)
M3 submachine gun (American made, also known as grease gun)
Sten submachine gun (British made)
Thompson submachine gun (American made)

Automatic rifles

HROPI automatic rifle (Greek made)
FN FAL (Belgian origin and Greek modification)
Heckler & Koch G3 (German origin and Greek made)

Rifles

Lee-Enfield rifle (British made)
M1 Garand (American made)
Springfield M1903 (American made)

Scoped rifles

EVO M1995 Kifefs (Greek made)

Light machine guns

Bren machine gun (British made)
Browning M1918 (American made)

Medium machine guns

Browning M1919 (American made)

Heavy machine guns

Browning M2 (American made)

Grenades

Elviemek EM-01 grenade (Greek made)
Elviemek EM-14 rifle grenade (Greek made)
Improvised bombs and grenades (Greek made)

Mortars

EVO E44 81mm mortar (Greek made)
EVO E56 120mm mortar (Greek made)
M1 81mm mortar (American made and French origin)

Anti-tank weapons

EVO M1984 Aris IV AT rocket launcher (Greek made)

Anti-aircraft weapons

EPTAE M1990 Aris AA missile launcher (Greek made)
EVO 30mm M1982 Artemis AA gun (Greek made)

Drones

EADS 3 Sigma Nearchos (Greek made)
EAV (HAI) Ε1-79 Pegasos I (Greek made)

Other vehicles

AEC Matador (British made gun carrier)
BTR-60PU and PU-12M (Russian made armoured personnel carrier)
ELVO Leonidas Ι (Austrian origin and Greek made armoured personnel carrier)
ELVO Leonidas ΙΙ (Austrian origin and Greek made armoured personnel carrier)
M3 Half-Track (American made armoured personnel carrier)
M3A1 Scout Car (American made armoured personnel carrier)
M4 Tractor (American made gun carrier)
M5 Tractor (American made gun carrier)
M32A1B3, M32Β1, M32Β3 and M32Β4 (American made recovery tank)
M59 (American made armoured personnel carrier)
M74 (American made recovery tank)
M578 (American made recovery tank)
Morris C8 (British made gun carrier)
Motorcycles (Made in various countries)
MOWAG Grenadier amphibisch schutzenpanzer (Swiss made amphibious armoured personnel carrier, used by gendarmerie)
MOWAG Roland schutzenpanzer (Swiss made armoured personnel carrier, used by police forces)
MT-LB (Russian made amphibious armoured personnel carrier)
NDI MRAP (American made armoured personnel carrier)
Trucks (Made in different countries, to carry supplies)
Universal Carrier (British made supply carrier)
Willys MB (American made personnel carrier, also known as Jeep)
Willys MC (American made personnel carrier, also known as M38 Jeep)
Willys MD (American made personnel carrier, also known as M38A1 Jeep)

Armoured cars and trucks

General Motors C15TA (Canadian made armoured truck)
General Motors Otter (Canadian made light armoured truck)
Humber Armoured car Mk IV (British made)
Humber LRC (British made light armoured car)
Humber Scout car Mk I and Mk II (British made light armoured car)
M8 Greyhound (American made light armoured car)
Marmon-Herrington Mk I, Mk III and Mk IV F (South African made armoured car)
T17E1 Staghound (American made armoured car)

Self-propelled artillery

M42 Duster (American made anti-aircraft tank)

Tanks

A-27L Centaur Mk I and Mk VIII (British made medium tank)
AMX-10P (French made infantry fighting tank)
AMX-30 (French made medium tank)
ELVO Kentavros (Greek made infantry fighting tank)
Fiat-Ansaldo L3/35 (Italian captured tankette)
M3A3 Stuart Recce (American made light tank)
M18 Hellcat (American made tank destroyer)
M24 Chaffee (American made light tank)
M47 Patton (American made battle tank)
M48A3 Patton (American made battle tank)
M60 (American made battle tank)
T-34-85 (Russian made medium tank)
Vickers-Armstrongs Mk VI (British made light tank)

Ships

Submarines

Balao-class submarines (American made)
S86 Triena
S114 Papanikolis ΙΙ
Gato-class submarines (American made)
S17 Amfitriti VII
S78 Posidon III
Glafkos-class submarines (German made)
HDW Typ 209/1100 S110 Glafkos ΙΙΙ
HDW Typ 209/1100 S111 Nirefs ΙΙ
HDW Typ 209/1100 S112 Triton ΙΙ
HDW Typ 209/1100 S113 Protefs ΙΙ
HDW Typ 209/1200 S116 Posidon IV
HDW Typ 209/1200 S117 Amfitriti IX
HDW Typ 209/1200 S118 Okeanos
HDW Typ 209/1200 S119 Pontos
S115 Katsonis III (American made)
U-class submarines (British made)
Υ10 Xifias ΙΙ
Υ11 Amfitriti VI
V-class submarines (British made)
Υ8 Pipinos
Υ9 Delfin ΙΙ
Υ14 Triena Ι
Υ15 Argonaftis
Υ7 Matrozos (Italian captured)

Aircraft

Aero Commander 680F and 680FL (American made)
Arado Ar 196A-3 and A-5 (German captured)
Avro 652 Anson Mk I and Mk II (British made)
Beechcraft C-45F Expeditor (American made)
Bell 47G-3, G-5, J-2, OH-13H and S Sioux (American made)
Cessna T-37B and C Tweet (American made)
Cessna T-41D Mescalero (American made)
Convair F-102Α and ΤF-102Α Delta Dagger (American made)
Curtiss SB2C-5 Helldiver (American made)
Dassault Mirage F.1CG (French made)
De Havilland Canada DHC-2 Beaver (Canadian made)
De Havilland D.H.82A Tiger Moth II (British made)
Douglas C-47A, B and D Skytrain (American made, the British nicknamed it Dakota from a name of some Indian tribes such as the Lakota and Nakota)
Fieseler Fi 156C-1 (German captured)
Grumman G-159 Gulfstream I (American made)
Grumman HU-16 Albatross (American made)
Junkers Ju 290A-5 (German captured)
Lockheed F-104G, RF-104G and TF-104G Starfighter (American made)
Lockheed T-33A Silver Star (American made)
LTV A-7E, H, TA-7C and H Corsair II (American made)
Messerschmitt Bf 109G-6 (German captured)
Nord 2501D Noratlas (French made)
North American AT-6A, D and G Texan (American made)
North American F-86D and E Sabre (American made)
North American-Ryan L-17B Navion (American made)
Northrop F-5Α, Β, NF-5A, B and RF-5Α Freedom Fighter (American made)
Piper L-18B, C and L-21B Super Cub (American made)
Republic F-84F Thunderstreak (American made)
Republic F-84G Thunderjet (American made)
Republic RF-84F Thunderflash (American made)
Sikorsky UH-19B and D Chickasaw (American made)
Stinson L-5, L-5B and C Sentinel (American made)
Supermarine Spitfire Mk VB, Mk VC, Mk IX and Mk XVI (British made)
Taylorcraft Auster Mk III (British made)
Vickers 406 Wellington Mk XIIΙ and Mk XIV (British made)

Defensive weapons

Brodie helmet (British made)
M1 helmet (American made)
M1915 Adrian helmet (French made)
M1934/39 helmet (Italian origin and Greek modification)
M1938 helmet (Greek made)

Gallery with Greek modifications and constructions

See also

List of active Hellenic Navy ships
List of decommissioned ships of the Hellenic Navy
List of equipment of the Hellenic Army
List of aircraft of the Hellenic Air Force
List of historic aircraft of the Hellenic Air Force

References

Bibliography

External links

The Great war, Romanian & Greek weapons of World war I feat C&Rsenal
The Great war, Greek pistols and rifles of World war I feat C&Rsenal

Military equipment of Greece
Equipment, historical
History of the Hellenic Army
Hellenic armed forces